Selim Saadeh is a Lebanese politician, belonging to the Syrian Social Nationalist Party. He was born in 1949. He worked as administrative director of the TMA company. In 1992 he was elected to the Lebanese parliament, from a Greek Orthodox seat in Koura District.

References

1949 births
Living people
Syrian Social Nationalist Party politicians
Members of the Parliament of Lebanon
Greek Orthodox Christians from Lebanon